Yuba was a wooden-hulled, stern-wheel steamship that served as a snagboat for the United States Army Corps of Engineers.

History
Yuba was a stern-wheeled, shallow draft steamship ordered by the U.S. Engineers Department of the Army (now known as the United States Army Corps of Engineers) to serve as a snagboat on the Sacramento River. Her namesake was the Yuba River, a tributary of the Feather River which was the principal tributary of the Sacramento River.  The first snagboat on the Sacramento River, Seizer (240 GRT, 1881), had retired in 1921 and its replacement, Bear (242 GT, 1921),  was in need of support. Yuba was laid down on 19 November 1924 at the Alameda, California shipyard of A. W. de Young Boat & Shipbuilding Company who won the contract with a bid price of $78,346. The ship was designed by Captain Thomas B. Foster. The engine from the retired snagboat Seizer was utilized. She was launched on 27 February 1925, completed in March 1925, and commissioned in April 1925. She carried a complement of 4 officers and 26 enlisted men. She worked primarily on the San Joaquin River, the Mokelumne River, and the Sacramento River. Her ultimate fate is unknown.

References

External links

1925 ships
Ships built in Alameda, California
Stern-wheel steamboats of California
Ships built by the A. W. de Young Boat & Shipbuilding Company
Snagboats of the United States